The Johnson Formation (or Johnson Limestone) is a thick geologic formation of soft shale with thin, resistant beds of chalkier mudstone and limestone in Nebraska, Kansas, and Oklahoma rarely exposed outside of road cuts. It preserves fossils dating back to the late-Carboniferous period.

See also

 List of fossiliferous stratigraphic units in Kansas
 List of fossiliferous stratigraphic units in Nebraska
 List of fossiliferous stratigraphic units in Oklahoma
 Paleontology in Kansas
 Paleontology in Nebraska
 Paleontology in Oklahoma

References

Carboniferous geology of Oklahoma
Carboniferous Kansas
Carboniferous geology of Nebraska
Carboniferous southern paleotropical deposits